The 53rd Annual Country Music Association Awards were held on November 13, 2019 at Bridgestone Arena in Nashville, Tennessee. The ceremony recognizes some of the best country music released during the eligibility period. Carrie Underwood hosted the event with special guest hosts Reba McEntire and Dolly Parton, celebrating legendary women in country music. "In addition to awarding the year's best and brightest in the genre, the 53rd Annual CMA Awards will celebrate the legacy of women within country music, and we couldn't think of a more dynamic group of women to host the show." said CMA CEO Sarah Trahern. For the first time in CMA history, women were nominated in every category, except Male Vocalist of the Year. However, when all was said and done, the sole female Entertainer of the Year nominee, Carrie Underwood, lost the top honor to Garth Brooks; upsetting fans and leading to Garth Brooks stepping down from the category the following year.

Winners and nominees
The CMA Awards nominees were announced live on Good Morning America by Jimmie Allen, Ashley McBryde, Midland and Morgan Wallen. For the 53rd CMA Awards, an artist must have released work in the eligibility period which ran from July 1, 2018 to June 30, 2019. On November 6, 2019, Kris Kristofferson was revealed to be the recipient of the Willie Nelson Lifetime Achievement Award.

Winners were denoted in Bold.

International Awards

Performers

Presenters

Notes
 Carrie Underwood returned as host for her twelfth time; however, she was not joined by Brad Paisley for this year's show. Following the broadcast, Underwood announced that she would be stepping down as the host for the 54th CMA Awards.
 Jenee Fleenor was the first female ever to be nominated for Musician of the Year and subsequently became the first female to win the award.
 Kris Kristofferson was unable to accept his Lifetime Achievement Award in person because he had a prior commitment to play a show on the same night.

References 

Country Music Association
CMA
Country Music Association Awards
Country Music Association Awards
November 2019 events in the United States
2019 awards in the United States
21st century in Nashville, Tennessee
Events in Nashville, Tennessee